Arcueil–Cachan is a station on the line B of the Réseau Express Régional, a hybrid suburban commuter and rapid transit line. This will also be a station for Paris Metro Line 15. The station takes its name from its location near the city of Arcueil and inside the town of Cachan.

History

Inaugurated on 23 June 1846, this station is one of the oldest on the line, opened on 7 June 1846. The line manager had his premises there until the 1980s. It served as a model for many other stations on the section going to Orsay. Although bearing the name of the two municipalities of Arcueil and Cachan, the passenger station is located in the territory of Cachan. The neighboring municipality of Arcueil also has access to Laplace station, further north on line B (towards Paris), which is located on its territory.

Railway situation
The station is a classic configuration of two platforms surrounding 2 tracks. The station is built on a hill with a steep slope, so that the north side of the station is at ground level, and the southern part is raised above the ground ( backfill).

North of the station passes the Vanne aqueduct, in the territory of Arcueil. In addition, there is an old freight station now used as a siding for certain works equipment or RATP trainsets.

By 2025, it should also accommodate an underground station for line 15 of the Grand Paris Express. The future Grand Paris Express station will be located under the RER B tracks at an angle close to 90 °. Its platforms will be at a depth of −24 m. A passenger building for correspondence will be built.

The station is located at "Point Kilometrique"(PK) 10 .310(southern ending of platforms)

Connection
The station is served by:

Bus lines V3 and V4 of the "Valouette" bus network
In 2024/2025

Gallery

References

See also

 List of stations of the Paris RER

Railway stations in France opened in 1846